Gershom Bradford Weston, (27 Aug 1799 - 14 Sep 1869) son of shipbuilding tycoon Ezra Weston II (1772-1842) (AKA: King Caesar II) and his wife Jerusha Bradford (1770-1833), who were both direct descendants of six Mayflower pilgrims. Gershom was a large man with reddish hair, weighing about 250 pounds.

At an age 17 he began sailing on his father's ships to Denmark, England and India, before taking on a managerial role in the family business. From 1842 to 1857 he and his brothers ran the family firm until it closed down.

At age 28 he entered politics as a member of the Massachusetts House of Representatives and served there for 12 years before becoming a state justice. In 1848 Gershom joined the newly formed Free-Soil Political Party and strongly advocated it's Temperance and Abolitionist platform - "Free Soil, Free Speech, Free Labor and Free Men".

He stood as the Free-Soil candidate for the U.S. Congress and lost by fewer than 150 votes.

Gershom was married twice and had 14 children, several of whom served with honor in the US Civil War.

Late in life, Gershom experienced a series significant financial reverses.  In 1850 his 30-acre mansion burned to the ground.  By 1857 his shipping business had folded. In 1868, friends from the Massachusetts Senate purchased for him the small house he was then renting.

See also
 1868 Massachusetts legislature
 1869 Massachusetts legislature

Notes

References 

1799 births
1869 deaths
American boat builders
Members of the Massachusetts House of Representatives
Justices of the Massachusetts Superior Court of Judicature
People from Duxbury, Massachusetts
19th-century American politicians